The Fugitive is a 1993 American action thriller film based on the 1960s television series of the same name created by Roy Huggins. The film was directed by Andrew Davis and stars Harrison Ford, Tommy Lee Jones, Sela Ward, Joe Pantoliano, Andreas Katsulas, and Jeroen Krabbé. The screenplay was written by David Twohy and Jeb Stuart from a story by Twohy. After being framed for the murder of his wife and sentenced to death, Dr. Richard Kimble escapes from custody following a bus crash and sets out to find the real killer and clear his name while being hunted by the police and a team of U.S. Marshals.

The Fugitive premiered in Westwood on July 29, 1993, and was released in the United States and Sweden on August 6, 1993. It was a critical and commercial success, spending six weeks as the #1 film in the United States, and grossing nearly $370 million worldwide against a $44 million budget. It was the third-highest-grossing film of 1993 domestically with an estimated 44 million tickets sold in the U.S. It was nominated for seven Academy Awards including Best Picture; Jones won for Best Supporting Actor. It was followed by a 1998 spin-off, U.S. Marshals, in which Jones reprised his role as Deputy Marshal Gerard along with some others of his earlier Marshals team.

Plot

Chicago vascular surgeon Dr. Richard Kimble returns home to discover his wife, Helen, mortally wounded by a one-armed assailant. Despite his efforts, the attacker evades capture. Kimble's account of events is dismissed due to the absence of forced entry, Helen's substantial life insurance policy, and a misinterpreted 911 call. Consequently, he is falsely accused of murder, convicted, and receives a death sentence.

During transport to death row, Kimble's fellow prisoners attempt an escape. In the unrest, the driver and two prisoners are killed, sending the bus down a ravine into the path of an oncoming train. Kimble saves a guard and escapes the collision. Ninety minutes later, US Deputy Marshal Samuel Gerard and his staff arrive at the derailment scene and launch a manhunt. After altering his appearance and stealing an ambulance, Kimble almost gets caught in a tunnel, but evades the marshals by slipping into a storm drain. Eventually cornered by Gerard, Kimble proclaims his innocence but jumps off a spillway over a dam, escaping.

Kimble returns to Chicago to find the true killer, acquiring money from his friend Dr. Charles Nichols. He assumes the identity of a janitor to infiltrate the prosthetic department at Cook County Hospital to make a list of patients matching the killer's. In the meantime, he changes the medical instructions for a misdiagnosed trauma patient, thus saving his life. Kimble's cover is blown and flees the building when a doctor becomes suspicious and alerts the authorities.

Gerard suspects that Kimble is searching for the one-armed man and spots him at Chicago City Hall after interviewing a jailed suspect. After an intense chase, Kimble disappears into a St. Patrick's Day parade. Later, he breaks into the home of another suspect on his list, Frederick Sykes, and discovers a photo that confirms Sykes as the killer. Sykes is a former cop who now works security for Devlin-MacGregor, a pharmaceutical company that is releasing a new drug called Provasic. Kimble had researched and investigated the drug and found that it causes liver damage, which would have prevented FDA approval.

Kimble figures out that Dr. Nichols, a board member of Devlin-MacGregor, covered up the dangerous side effects of Provasic to get it approved and ordered Sykes to kill him in a staged burglary that went wrong, resulting in Helen's death. Nichols also presumably had Sykes kill Dr. Alec Lentz, another developer who discovered the drug's risks. Kimble calls Gerard with the new information, and he then conducts his own parallel investigation. Kimble then heads to a hotel conference where Nichols is presenting Provasic, but on his way there, he is attacked by Sykes on a train. In the struggle, Sykes kills a transit cop, but Kimble overpowers him and handcuffs him to a pole.

Kimble publicly confronts Nichols at the conference. This leads to a fight that spills onto the roof. They crash through a skylight onto a descending elevator. A shoot-to-kill order is issued for Kimble as the transit police officer's death is assumed to be his fault. However, Gerard stops a police helicopter from sniping Kimble. Nichols regains consciousness and tries to escape through a laundry room, but Kimble follows him. Gerard and his colleague Renfro follow closely behind, and Gerard calls out to Kimble, informing him of the conspiracy and his belief in Kimble's innocence. Nichols knocks out Renfro, takes his gun, and tries to shoot Gerard, but Kimble saves him by attacking Nichols from behind.

Kimble surrenders while Sykes and Nichols are arrested. He is escorted out of the hotel as the press questions the police about the newly found suspects, indicating his innocence. Gerard uncuffs Kimble and offers him an ice pack in the back of a squad car. They are driven away into the night, with Kimble's exoneration assured.

Cast

 Harrison Ford as Dr. Richard Kimble
 Tommy Lee Jones as Deputy U.S. Marshal Sam Gerard
 Sela Ward as Helen Kimble
 Joe Pantoliano as Deputy U.S. Marshal Cosmo Renfro
 Andreas Katsulas as Fredrick Sykes
 Jeroen Krabbé as Dr. Charles Nichols			
 Daniel Roebuck as Deputy U.S. Marshal Bobby Biggs
 Tom Wood as Deputy U.S. Marshal Noah Newman
 L. Scott Caldwell as Deputy U.S. Marshal Erin Poole
 Johnny Lee Davenport as Deputy U.S. Marshal Henry
 Julianne Moore as Dr. Anne Eastman
 Ron Dean as Detective Kelly
 Joseph Kosala as Detective Rosetti
 Jane Lynch as Dr. Kathy Wahlund
 Dick Cusack as Attorney Walter Gutherie
 Andy Romano as Judge Bennett
 Nick Searcy as Sheriff Rawlins
 Eddie Bo Smith as Copeland
 Neil Flynn as Transit Cop
 Richard Riehle as Old Guard
 Kirsten Nelson as Hospital Secretary
 David Darlow as Dr. Alec Lentz 
 Frank Ray Perilli as Corrections Officer
 Lester Holt as Newscaster

Production

Casting
Harrison Ford was not originally cast for the role of Dr. Richard Kimble. Instead, a number of actors were auditioned for the part, including Alec Baldwin, Nick Nolte, Kevin Costner and Michael Douglas. Nolte in particular felt he was too old for the role (though he is only a year older than Ford). According to Ford in a 2023 interview with James Hibberd of The Hollywood Reporter, he pursued the role of Richard Kimble due to his liking to play characters who aren't like him in addition of his desire to grow a beard or a moustache for a role, which then Warner Bros. chairman Robert A. Daly often denied due to paying to see his face unchanged. Although the role of Sam Gerard went to Tommy Lee Jones, Gene Hackman and Jon Voight were both considered for the role. The character of Dr. Charles Nichols was recast for Jeroen Krabbé after the original actor who landed the role, Richard Jordan, fell ill with a brain tumor. Jordan subsequently died three weeks after the film's release.

Filming
Filming began in February and wrapped in mid-May. Filming locations included Bryson City and Dillsboro, North Carolina; Blount County, Tennessee; and Chicago. Although almost half of the film is set in rural Illinois, a large portion of the principal filming was actually shot in Jackson County, North Carolina in the Great Smoky Mountains.

The prison transport bus and freight train wreck scenes were filmed along the Great Smoky Mountains Railroad just outside their depot in Dillsboro; the wreckage can still be seen from the railroad's excursion trains. The train crash, which cost $1 million to film, was shot in a single take using a real train with a locomotive whose engine had been removed. The wreck took several weeks to plan and was preceded by several test runs with a boxcar and a log car.

Scenes in the hospital after Kimble initially escapes were filmed at Harris Regional Hospital in Sylva, North Carolina. Cheoah Dam in Deals Gap was the location of the scene in which Kimble jumps from the dam.

The rest of the film was shot in Chicago, including some of the dam scenes, which were filmed in the remains of the Chicago freight tunnels. The city hall stair chase (where Kimble narrowly escapes being apprehended by Gerard) was filmed in the corridors and lobby of Chicago City Hall. The character Sykes lived in the historic Pullman neighborhood of Chicago. Harrison Ford uses the pay phone in the Pullman Pub, and then climbs a ladder and runs down the roofline of the historic rowhouses. According to Andrew Davis, it was Ford's idea to film in Chicago. "Originally I wasn't even going to try to come to Chicago. I thought that the weather would be too cold and difficult for shooting. But Harrison, having seen several of my prior films shot in Chicago, suggested doing it here." Ford would later explain, "I grew up in Chicago, went to college in Wisconsin, and came back to take summer jobs for three years. I felt this was the best possible option as a location...We could get the grittiness, we could get the flash of architecture, the charm of the lake. It has it all."

The chase scene during the St. Patrick's Day Parade was filmed during the actual parade held that year on Wednesday, March 17, 1993, with Mayor Richard M. Daley and Illinois Attorney General Roland Burris briefly seen as actual participants. Besides The Fugitive, another feature film, Michael Apted's Blink, was filmed during the exact same parade. According to Charles Geocaris, then head of the Chicago Film Office, both productions approached the film office in February about filming during the parade. Location managers and production managers for both films worked out the logistics with parade organizers, but according to Geocaris, the two camera crews would still occasionally run into each other during their shoots. Complicating matters was the weather which was fairly cold at 21 degrees Fahrenheit (below freezing) along with a windchill factor of minus 6. Nevertheless, disruption was at a minimum, with Geocaris recalling that "people on the parade route were laughing as Tommy Lee Jones chased Harrison Ford...It was a fun thing for them."

Cinematographer Michael Chapman credits Davis for the film's distinctive use of Chicago, which drew much praise upon its release. "A lot of it really feels like Chicago, because it just has a native's eye to it. That's Andy's, not mine. He knew where to look." Chapman was actually hired a week into production after his predecessor was fired, and he claims he only took the job because the money was too good. Throughout the production, Chapman would go back and forth between documentary and theatrical methods, using handheld cameras and natural light for scenes like the first house raid and then adding unexpected light sources throughout the tunnel chase as the realistic absence of light was deemed unfeasible. Though his work was later recognized with an Academy Award nomination, Chapman said it was an unhappy experience as he never got along with Davis. "I said 'I hated being there' and 'I was the wrong guy' and cursed...but it all worked out, so you never know."

Much of the film was rewritten throughout production and typically on the day each scene was supposed to shoot. According to Davis, he never met with credited screenwriter David Twohy, whose main contribution was writing the train crash. Beyond that, Davis said "he wasn’t involved in anything we did. Jeb Stuart was there with us...basically responding to things we were coming up with all the time...[Warner Bros.] can’t talk about this because of the Writers Guild, but Tommy Lee Jones, myself, Harrison [Ford] and other people who were close with us, especially coming up with the whole plot about the pharmaceuticals, they were uncredited writers." Jane Lynch, who was cast as Dr. Kathy Wahlund in one of her first film roles, recalled having that experience, with both Ford and herself working out new dialogue for their scene right before they filmed it as Ford "didn't like the scene as it was written."

Given Ford's limited window of availability, Davis had only ten weeks to edit, mix and finish the film between the last day of shooting and the day it opened in theaters. To meet their schedule, producer Peter MacGregor-Scott set up seven editing suites at Warner Hollywood Studios and had a team of editors cutting around the clock as they each worked on different scenes. Each editor would be recognized for their work on the film with an Academy Award nomination.

Music
James Newton Howard composed the film's musical score,  which Janet Maslin of The New York Times called "hugely effective".

Howard had a difficult time scoring the film, recalling that "The Fugitive really kicked my ass. When I was hired for it, I was terrified." He became more despondent after listening to Jerry Goldsmith's work, which he had been using as placeholders for scenes that needed music. Howard wasn't confident that he could match the quality of those temporary cues, but he refused to quit, eventually conceding that his score would be a "quasi-failure." He was particularly dissatisfied with his work on the chase scenes, believing his string arrangements were too awkward. When he was given an Academy Award nomination, Howard said "I was completely shocked. I just didn’t think [my score] was worthy of a nomination, but that’s often what happens. It worked, and the movie was so good. It makes everybody look better."

Elektra Records released an album featuring selections from the score on August 31, 1993. La-La Land Records later released a 2-disc, expanded and remastered edition of the score, featuring over an hour of previously unreleased music, tracks from the original soundtrack, and alternate cues.

Release

Home media
The film was released on VHS and Laserdisc on March 10, 1994, and on DVD in the United States on March 26, 1997. A special edition widescreen DVD was released on June 5, 2001. The film generated  in revenue from video rentals.

In 2009, a repackaged variant was released. Special features on the DVD include behind-the-scenes documentaries, audio commentary by Tommy Lee Jones and director Andrew Davis, an introduction with the film's stars and creators, and the theatrical trailer.

The film was released on Blu-ray on September 26, 2006. Special features include commentary by Tommy Lee Jones and director Andrew Davis, two documentaries, and the theatrical trailer. The audio and visual quality received negative reviews, with Blu-ray.com calling it "mostly abysmal". A 20th anniversary Blu-ray edition was released on September 3, 2013, with a new transfer, along with DTS-HD Master Audio tracking among other features.

Reception

Box office
The Fugitive opened strongly at the US box office, grossing $23,758,855 in its first weekend from 2,340 theaters, taking the number one spot off of Rising Sun and surpassing Unforgiven to achieve a record August opening weekend. For six years, the film would hold this record until 1999 when it was surpassed by The Sixth Sense. It held the top spot for six weeks.

The Fugitive was the first major American film to be screened in the People's Republic of China in nearly a decade, following restrictions on foreign films; First Blood (1982) was released there in 1985. The Fugitive grossed  in 1994, the highest for a Hollywood film in China, up until it was surpassed by True Lies (1994), which was released there in 1995.

Critical response
On Rotten Tomatoes The Fugitive has a "Certified Fresh" 96% rating based on 81 reviews, with an average rating of 8.10/10. The website's critics consensus reads, "Exhilarating and intense, this high-impact chase thriller is a model of taut and efficient formula filmmaking, and it features Harrison Ford at his frantic best." On Metacritic the film has a weighted average score of 87 out of 100, based on 32 critics, indicating "universal acclaim". Audiences surveyed by CinemaScore gave the film a rare "A+" grade on a scale of A+ to F.

Desson Howe, writing in The Washington Post, called the film "A juggernaut of exaggeration, momentum and thrills—without a single lapse of subtlety—"Fugitive" is pure energy, a perfect orchestration of heroism, villainy, suspense and comic relief. Ford makes the perfect rider for a project like this, with his hangdog-handsome everyman presence. He's one of us—but one of us at his personal best. It's great fun to ride along with him." Left impressed, Rita Kempley also writing in The Washington Post, surmised how the filmed contained "Beautifully matched adversaries" figuring, "One represents the law, the other justice—and it's the increasingly intimate relationship between them that provides the tension. Otherwise, 'The Fugitive' would be little more than one long chase scene, albeit a scorchingly paced and innovative one." In a mixed review, Marc Savlov of The Austin Chronicle wrote that "Director Davis valiantly tries to keep the breakneck, harried pace of an actual flight going throughout, and only occasionally drops the ball (the film's convoluted conspiracy ending is the first example to beat me about the face and neck just now—others will crop up after deadline, I'm sure)." Of the lead actor's performance he said, "Ford may be the closest thing we have these days to a Gary Cooper, but really, where's David Janssen when we really need him?" Owen Gleiberman of Entertainment Weekly said that the film was about "two chases, two suspense plots running on parallel—and finally convergent—tracks. Kimble and Gerard spend the entire film on opposite sides of the law. Before long, though, we realize we're rooting for both of them; they're both protagonists, united in brains, dedication, superior gamesmanship. The film's breathless momentum springs from their jaunty competitive urgency." In a 2018 review for The Atlantic, Soraya Roberts says the film is "notable for being the best of a genre that no longer really exists: the character-driven Hollywood action movie for adults."

The film was not without its detractors. Geoff Andrew of Time Out viewed the film as "A glossy, formula chase movie with the requisite number of extravagant action sequences". The critic added, "Ford is up to par for the strenuous stuff, but falls short on the grief, anxiety and compassion, allowing Tommy Lee Jones to walk away with the show as the wisecracking marshal on Kimble's trail." Columnist Ethan Ham writing for the Bright Lights Film Journal speculated that supporting actor Tommy Lee Jones' character was "much more disturbing than the inept police." Later explaining, "In Kimble's first encounter with Gerard, Kimble says, 'I didn't kill her!' Gerard responds, 'I don't care. In the Chicago Sun-Times, noted film critic Roger Ebert voiced his enthusiasm with the film observing, "The device of the film is to keep Kimble only a few steps ahead of his pursuers. It is a dangerous strategy, and could lead to laughable close calls and near-misses, but Davis tells the story of the pursuit so clearly on the tactical level that we can always understand why Kimble is only so far ahead, and no further. As always, Davis uses locations not simply as the place where action occurs, but as part of the reason for the action." Rating the film with three stars, James Berardinelli of ReelViews professed, "Following the opening scenes, we're treated to over a half-hour of nonstop action as Gerard and his men track down Kimble. Directed and photographed with a flair, this part of the movie keeps viewers on the edges of their seats. Most importantly, when on the run, Kimble acts like an intelligent human being. Equally as refreshing, the lawmen are his match, not a bunch of uniformed dunces being run around in circles."

For the most part, satisfied with the quality of the motion picture, Jonathan Rosenbaum of the Chicago Reader said that "The mystery itself is fairly routine, but Jones's offbeat and streamlined performance as a proudly diffident [sic] investigator helps one overlook the mechanical crosscutting and various implausibilities, and director Andrew Davis does a better-than-average job with the action sequences." Leonard Klady writing in Variety exclaimed, "This is one film that doesn't stint on thrills and knows how to use them. It has a sympathetic lead, a stunning antagonist, state-of-the-art special effects, top-of-the-line craftsmanship and a taut screenplay that breathes life into familiar territory." Film critic Chris Hicks of the Deseret News accounted for the fact that the film "has holes in its plotting that are easy to pick apart and characters that are pretty thin, bolstered by the performances of seasoned vets who know how to lend heft to their roles." But in summary he stated, "the film is so stylish, so funny and so heart-stopping in its suspense that the audience simply doesn't care about flaws."

Accolades
The film was nominated and won several awards in 1993–1994. Various film critics included the film on their lists of the top 10 best films for that year; including Roger Ebert of the Chicago Sun-Times who named it the fourth best film of 1993.

Year-end lists
American Film Institute Lists
 AFI's 100 Years...100 Thrills - #33

Other media

Spin-off/sequel

Jones returned as Gerard in a 1998 spin-off, U.S. Marshals. It also incorporates Gerard's team hunting an escaped fugitive, but does not involve Harrison Ford as Kimble or the events of the initial 1993 feature.

Novelization
Jeanne Kalogridis wrote a mass-market paperback novelization of the film. She worked from the original screenplay, which characterizes a doctor unjustly accused of a crime, while being pursued relentlessly by federal authorities.

Remakes
The movie was remade in India in Telugu and Hindi in 1994/1995 as Criminal and in 1995 as Nirnayam in Malayalam. While the central theme of the movie remained the same, some details were altered to suit the local set up. In November 2019, it was announced that Brian Tucker would serve as a screenwriter on a remake of The Fugitive.

A 2-part TV mini-series, Tôbôsha, was broadcast on TV Asahi which stars Ken Watanabe as Dr. Kazuki Kakurai in a plot that closely follows the 1993 film.

See also

 In 1998, a parody film Wrongfully Accused, based on The Fugitive, was developed with Leslie Nielsen portraying the principal character. Although the film spoofs many other motion pictures such as Mission: Impossible and Titanic, the storyline revolves around Nielsen's character being framed for a murder, as he escapes from federal custody to seek out the real suspect behind the crime. 
 Sam Sheppard
 1993 in film

References
Footnotes

Further reading

External links

  
 
 
 
 
 

1993 action thriller films

1990s chase films
1993 crime thriller films
1990s mystery thriller films
1993 films
American action thriller films 
American chase films
American crime thriller films
American mystery thriller films
BAFTA winners (films)
Fictional portrayals of the Chicago Police Department
Films about amputees
Films about miscarriage of justice
American films about revenge
Films about surgeons
Films based on television series
Films directed by Andrew Davis
Films featuring a Best Supporting Actor Academy Award-winning performance
Films featuring a Best Supporting Actor Golden Globe winning performance
Films produced by Arnold Kopelson
Films scored by James Newton Howard
Films set in Chicago
Films set in Indiana
Films shot in Chicago
Films shot in North Carolina
Films shot in Tennessee
Medical-themed films
American police detective films
Films with screenplays by David Twohy
Films with screenplays by Jeb Stuart
Film
United States Marshals Service in fiction
Warner Bros. films
Saint Patrick's Day films
1990s English-language films
1990s American films